Mark A. Altman is a writer, producer and actor. He is a former Los Angeles bureau chief for Cinefantastique magazine and was also a previous editor in chief of Sci-Fi Universe magazine. He has also been a writer for comic books.

Credits

Film 
Free Enterprise (writer, producer, actor, 1998)
Where No Fan Has Gone Before: The Making of Free Enterprise (producer, 1999)
The Specials (producer, actor, 2000)
House of the Dead (writer, producer)
All Souls Day: Dia de los Muertos (writer, producer)
House of the Dead 2 (writer, producer, actor, 2005)
CFQ: Cafe FAntastique (executive producer, 2006)
Room 6 (writer, producer, actor, 2006)
DOA: Dead or Alive (producer, 2006)
The Thirst (writer, producer, 2006)
All Souls Day (writer, producer)
Dead And Deader (writer, producer, actor, 2006)
The Darkroom (writer, producer, 2006)
Monarch (executive producer, 2013)
Caught on Tape (executive producer, 2013)
50 Years of Star Trek (executive producer, 2016)

Television 
Castle (co-producer, 2009)
Necessary Roughness (producer, writer, 2011)
Femme Fatales (executive producer, writer, director, actor, 2011-2012)
Agent X (co-executive producer, writer, 2015)
Aries Spears: Comedy Blueprint (director, 2016)
The Librarians (co-executive producer, writer, 2016-2017)
Pandora (creator, showrunner, executive producer, 2019-2020)

Podcasts 
Inglorious Treksperts (co-host, producer, 2018-2019)
The 4:30 Movie Podcast (co-host, producer, 2019)
Best Movies Never Made (producer, 2019-2020)

Books 

Captains' Logs: The Unauthorized Complete Trek Voyages (with Edward Gross, 1995)
Captains' Logs Supplemental: The Unauthorized Guide to the New Trek Voyages (with Edward Gross, 1996)
The Fifty-Year Mission: The Complete, Uncensored, Unauthorized Oral History of Star Trek: The First 25 Years (with Edward Gross, 2016)
The Fifty-Year Mission: The Next 25 Years: From The Next Generation to J.J. Abrams: The Complete, Uncensored, Unauthorized Oral History of Star Trek (with Edward Gross, 2016)
Slayers & Vampires: The Complete, Uncensored, Unauthorized Oral History of Buffy The Vampire Slayer & Angel (with Edward Gross, 2017)
So Say We All: The Complete, Uncensored, Unauthorized Oral History of Battlestar Galactica (with Edward Gross, 2018)
Nobody Does It Better: The Complete, Uncensored, Unauthorized Oral History of James Bond (with Edward Gross, 2020)
Secrets of the Force: The Complete, Uncensored, Unauthorized Oral History of Star Wars (with Edward Gross, 2021)
 They Shouldn't Have Killed His Dog: The Complete Uncensored Ass-Kicking Oral History of John Wick, Gun Fu, and the New Age of Action (with Edward Gross, 2022)

References

External links

Living people
Year of birth missing (living people)
American male screenwriters
American film producers